The Rodin Museum is an art museum located in Philadelphia, Pennsylvania that contains one of the largest collections of sculptor Auguste Rodin's works outside Paris. Opened in 1929, the museum is administered by the Philadelphia Museum of Art.  The museum houses a collection of nearly 150 objects containing bronzes, marbles, and plasters by Rodin.

In 2012, the museum re-opened after a three-year, $9 million renovation that brought the museum back to its original vision of displaying Rodin's works.

Founding
The Museum was the gift of movie-theatre magnate Jules Mastbaum (1872–1926) to the city of Philadelphia. Mastbaum began collecting works by Rodin in 1923 with the intent of founding a museum to enrich the lives of his fellow citizens. Within just three years, he had assembled the largest collection of Rodin's works outside Paris, including bronze castings, plaster studies, drawings, prints, letters, and books. In 1926, Mastbaum commissioned French architects Paul Cret and Jacques Gréber to design the museum building and gardens. The collector did not live to see his dream realized, but his widow, Etta Wedell Mastbaum honored his commitment to the city, and the Museum opened on November 29, 1929. Murals in the museum were executed by the painter Franklin C. Watkins.

Collection

The best-known of Rodin's works, The Thinker (1880–1882), sits outside the museum in the entry courtyard. Visitors once entered through a cast of The Gates of Hell, located at the main entrance to the museum, which is no longer used.  This massive 5.5-m-tall bronze doorway was originally created for the Museum of Decorative Arts (which was to have been located in Paris but never came into existence).  Rodin sculpted more than 100 figures for these doors from 1880 until his death in 1917. This casting is one of the three originals; several others have been made since. Several of his most famous works, including The Thinker, are actually studies for these doors which were later expanded into separate works.

The museum's several rooms house many more of the artist's works, including The Kiss (1886), Eternal Springtime (1884), The Age of Bronze (1875–76), and The Burghers of Calais, a monument commissioned by the City of Calais in 1884.

In 2019, the Rodin museum mounted a two-year special exhibition titled Rethinking the Modern Monument, curated by Alexander Kauffman, which paired 16 works from the Philadelphia Museum of Art with selected Rodin sculptures.  The special exhibition featured bronze sculptures by Jean Arp, Barbara Hepworth, Jacques Lipchitz, Marino Marini, Chana Orloff, and Alberto Giacometti, among others.

Image gallery

See also

 Benjamin Franklin Parkway
 List of single-artist museums

References

External links

Listing at Philadelphia Architects and Buildings

1929 establishments in Pennsylvania
Art museums established in 1929
Art museums and galleries in Philadelphia
Auguste Rodin
Paul Philippe Cret buildings
Philadelphia Museum of Art
Philadelphia Register of Historic Places
Sculpture gardens, trails and parks in the United States
Spring Garden, Philadelphia